Suzanna is a 1923 American silent comedy-drama film starring Mabel Normand and directed F. Richard Jones. The picture was produced by Mack Sennett, who also adapted the screenplay from a story by Linton Wells. A partial copy of the film, which is missing two reels, is in a European archive.

The cinematographers were Fred W. Jackman, Homer Scott, and Robert Walters, and the supporting cast features George Nichols, Walter McGrail, Léon Bary, Winifred Bryson, and Minnie Devereaux. The composer was Bert Lewis.

Cast
 Mabel Normand as Suzanna
 George Nichols as Don Fernando
 Walter McGrail as Ramón
 Evelyn Sherman as Doña Isabella
 Léon Bary as Pancho (as Leon Bary)
 Eric Mayne as Don Diego
 Winifred Bryson as Dolores
 Carl Stockdale as Ruiz
 Lon Poff as Álvarez
 George Cooper as Miguel
 Minnie Devereaux as herself
 Black Hawk as himself

References

External links

 
 

1923 films
American silent feature films
American black-and-white films
Films directed by F. Richard Jones
Films set in Mexico
1920s American films
1920s English-language films
Silent American comedy-drama films